State toys are designated by each U.S. state's legislature.

State toys

References

External links

Toy culture
Toy